Ira  is a village in the southern state of Karnataka, India. It is located in the Bantwal taluk of Dakshina Kannada district in Karnataka. Ira is situated at a distance of 30 km from Mangalore city. Ira is a showcase gram panchayat known for its cleanliness, sanitation and development projects. KIADB is planning a  small scale industrial park in Ira.

Demographics
 India census, Ira had a population of 6502 with 3199 males and 3303 females.

See also
 Dakshina Kannada
 Districts of Karnataka

References

External links
 http://dk.nic.in/

Villages in Dakshina Kannada district